In the following, a building is defined as a structure with a roof and walls that stands permanently in one place. Airports are excluded as their construction cost includes runways and systems; however, terminal buildings are included in the list.

See also 
Megaproject
List of megaprojects
List of largest buildings
List of tallest buildings
List of largest hotels

References

 

Expensive Buildings In The World, List Of Most
buildings
Lists of buildings and structures